Antonio Gala Velasco (born 2 October 1930) is a Spanish poet, playwright, novelist and writer.

Life and career
Gala was born in Brazatortas, Ciudad Real (Castile-La Mancha), although he moved very soon to Córdoba and is widely considered an Andalusian.

A graduate in law, philosophy, politics and economics, he has written in a wide variety of genres, including journalism, short stories, essays and television scripts. He has been awarded several prizes, not only within the field of poetry but also for his contributions to theatre and opera.

Gala's work has been more appreciated by his readership than by the critics, who find it hard to classify it due to its particular blend of lyricism and epic.

Among his most successful plays are Los verdes campos del Edén (The Green Fields of Eden, National Theatre Prize "Calderón de la Barca" 1963), Anillos para una dama (Rings for a Lady, 1973), ¿Por qué corres, Ulises? (Why do you run, Ulysses?, 1975), Petra Regalada (1980), Samarkanda (1985), Carmen, Carmen (1988) and La truhana (The rogue, 1992).

Among his collections of poetry are Sonetos de La Zubia (La Zubia Sonets), Poemas de amor (Love Poems), Testamento Andaluz (Andalusian Will) and Enemigo íntimo (Intimate Enemy, Adonais Prize 1959).

He started to write novels late in life, but he obtained an overwhelming success with El manuscrito carmesí (The Crimson Manuscript, Planeta Prize 1990), Águila Bicéfala (Two-Headed Eagle, 1994), La regla de tres (The Rule of Three, 1996) and La pasión turca (Turkish Passion, 1993), adapted for the cinema by Spanish director Vicente Aranda and Más allá del Jardín (Beyond the Garden, 1995), adapted by Pedro Olea.

Gala's literature is marked by historic issues, which are used more to lighten the present than to deepen in the past.

He is the current president of the International Theatre Institute.

Political views 
During the Spanish transition to democracy (1976 to the early 1980s) Gala publicly defended leftist political view points while not linked to a specific political party. In 1978 he called for a statute of autonomy for Andalusia.

In 1981 he was named president of the Spanish-Arab Friendship Association, and fulfilled this role for the first years of existence of this association. Around the same time he joined the Spain-USSR Friendship Society.

He was the president of the civic platform that defended the "no" to Spain's permanence in NATO, in the 1986 referendum.
In July 2014, during Israel's military operation in Gaza, Gala was accused of antisemitism because of an article published in the newspaper El Mundo with the following quote:
No matter what the Jews call their civil or military leaders, they end up creating problems for everyone: it is ancient history. Now it is Gaza's turn to suffer their abuses [..] It's not strange that they have been so frequently expelled. What is surprising, is that they persist. Either they are not good, or someone is poisoning them. I am not a racist.

The "Comunidad Judía de Madrid" (Jewish Community of Madrid) filed a lawsuit against him on discrimination, incitement to hatred and insult to the feelings of the members of a religious community and slander.

He is the president of the Antonio Gala Foundation in the city of Córdoba, Spain.

See also
 Café Gijón (Madrid)

References

External links
Some poems by Gala
Antonio Gala's Official Site

1930 births
Living people
People from Ciudad Real
Spanish male poets
Spanish male novelists
Spanish male dramatists and playwrights
20th-century Spanish male writers
20th-century Spanish poets
20th-century Spanish novelists
20th-century Spanish dramatists and playwrights
21st-century Spanish male writers
21st-century Spanish poets
21st-century Spanish novelists
21st-century Spanish dramatists and playwrights
Spanish LGBT poets
Spanish LGBT novelists
Spanish LGBT dramatists and playwrights
Bisexual poets
Bisexual novelists
Bisexual dramatists and playwrights
20th-century Spanish LGBT people
21st-century Spanish LGBT people